"Te Amaré" is a song performed by Latin pop boy band The Barrio Boyzz and written by one of its band members, Angel Ramirez, on their second studio album Donde Quiera Que Estés (1993). It peaked at number 16 on the Hot Latin Songs chart.

Marc Anthony version

American salsa singer Marc Anthony covered "Te Amaré" on his studio album Todo a Su Tiempo (1995). It became his fourth #1 song on the Tropical Airplay chart. The track was recognized as one of the best-performing songs of the year at the 1997 ASCAP Latin Awards on the tropical field.

Charts

See also
List of Billboard Tropical Airplay number ones of 1996

References

1993 songs
1994 singles
1996 singles
Barrio Boyzz songs
Marc Anthony songs
RMM Records singles
Spanish-language songs
Song recordings produced by Sergio George
EMI Latin singles